Aramits is a commune in the Pyrénées-Atlantiques department in the Nouvelle-Aquitaine region of south-western France.

The inhabitants of the commune are known as Aramitsiens or Aramitsiennes.

Geography

Location
Aramits is located in part of the Barétous valley, the westernmost of the three main valleys of Béarn crossing the Pyrenees. It is located some 15 km south-west of Oloron-Sainte-Marie and 3 km north of Arette.

Access
Access is by the D919 road from Ance in the north-east to the village then continuing to Lanne-en-Baretous in the south-west. There are also the minor roads D659 from the village north to join the D159 on the northern border and the D133 which goes south from the village to Arette.
 
Bus route 848 of the Inter-urban network of Pyrénées-Atlantiques, which connects La Pierre Saint-Martin (a ski resort in Arette) to Oloron-Sainte-Marie, has a stop in Aramits.

Hydrography
Located in the drainage basin of the Adour, the commune is bisected from south-west to north-east by : Le Vert a tributary of the Gave d'Oloron which gathers many tributaries of its own in the commune including the Aurone, the Lancy, the Littos, the Talou Gros, and also by the arrècs of Bugalaran, Bitole (as well its tributary the Rachet), Ibarcis, and Labaigt (and by its tributary the Audore).
 
The tributaries of the Joos: the Arriou de Sulu and the Bouhatéko erreka (with the Dragon) also flow through the commune.

Localities and hamlets

Aïtzaguer
Andillon
Arhanchet
Aripe
Atchouètos
Badet
Balen
Baliros
Villa Barétous
Bénébig
Bernasqué
Bigué
Bile
Bouenou
Bourette
Brincou
Fontaine Bugalaran
Bois de Bugangue
Borde Estanguet
Granges Cachau
Calangué
Camou
Capdeville
Carquet
Carrère
Casabonne
Casalet
Casemayou
Castera
Chandelle
Chicane
Chinaberry
Chourrout
Coig
Coig de Lamothe
Couéchot
Coustarou
Crapuchette
Escary
Escoubès
Escribasse
Estrate
Galard
Garay
La Gloriette
Gouloume
Gourroure
Guirail
Hondeville
Laborde
Lac de Bas
Lacazette
Lacouère
Lagarde
Lahitte
Lamothe (2 localities)
Lanne de Haut
Lanneretonne
Larrande
Lartigau
Laserre
Laude Bousquet
Grange Lerdou
Lesponne
Lhande
Loustalot
Loustaucaus
Grange de Lurbet
Mendioudou
Ménin
Mesplou
Miapira
Miramon
Mirande
Moncole
Mounolou
Les Murs
Olivé de Haut
Olivé de Baig
Oscamou
Grange d'Osse
Ounces
Oyhenard
Pastou
Les Pernes
Peyré
Grange de Pradet
Prat
Bois de Rachet
Pont de Rachou
Ripaète
Satzoury
Serres
Serreuille
Sottou
Soulou
Talou
Talou Andichou
Talou Piarroch
Tembla de la Loupère
Tos de Haut
Trébucq
Les Trois Arbres

Toponymy
The commune name in béarnais is Aràmits (according to classical norm of Occitan). For Brigitte Jobbé-Duval, the origin of the name is from the Basque aran ("valley") and -itz (a locative and collective suffix) giving "place of valleys" or "confluence". It would also indicate that the inhabitants were once nicknamed grenouilles (frogs) - a name for the inhabitants of wetlands).

The following table details the origins of the commune name and other names in the commune.

Sources:

Raymond: Topographic Dictionary of the Department of Basses-Pyrenees, 1863, on the page numbers indicated in the table. 
Grosclaude: Toponymic Dictionary of communes, Béarn, 2006 
Cassini: Cassini Map from 1750

Origins:
Ossau: Titles of the Ossau Valley
Luntz:
Insinuations: Insinuations of the Diocese of Oloron 
Aspe: Titles of the Aspe Valley
Census: Census of Béarn
Cour Majour: Regulations of the Cour Majour
Military: Military Inspection of Béarn

History
Paul Raymond on page 7 of his 1863 dictionary that Aramits is the former capital of the Barétous valley and that there were two Lay Abbeys, vassals of the Viscounts of Béarn: The Abadie-Susan and Abadie-Jusan.

He further noted that in 1385 there were 52 fires at Aramits and it depended on the bailiwick of Oloron.

Shortly before (in 1375), the priest of Aramits played the role of mediator in conflicts between the Navarrese and the Bearnese which gave birth to the treaty called the Junta de Roncal, leading to the yearly tribute of the three cows paid by Aramits to Isaba (Spain).

In 1790, the Canton of Aramits also included Esquiule.

On 13 March 2000 Aramits was hit by an earthquake of magnitude 4.2.

Heraldry

Administration

List of Successive Mayors

Inter-communality
Aramits is part of five inter-communal structures:
The Communauté de communes du Haut Béarn;
The SIVU for Tourism in Haute-Soule and Barétous;
The SIVU La Verna;
The Energy Association for Pyrénées-Atlantiques;
The Intercommunal association for study and management of the watershed of Le Vert and its tributaries.

Demography
In 2017 the commune had 669 inhabitants.

Economy
The economy of the town is primarily oriented toward agriculture and livestock (cattle and sheep). It is part of the Appellation d'origine contrôlée (AOC) zone designation of Ossau-iraty.

Culture and Heritage

Religious heritage
The Parish church of Saint-Vincent (17th century) is registered as an historical monument. It was a former Lay Abbey with the remains of a portal from the 17th century but the old church was demolished in 1880. The new Romanesque-Byzantine style church was built from 1884 to 1886.

Environmental heritage
The Sommet de Souek is 623 metres high
The Soum d'Unars is 604 metres
The Barrat de Sottou is 556 metres.

Facilities

Education
The commune has a primary school.

Sports and sports facilities
Rugby Union: the Entente Aramits plays in Fédérale 2. Pierre Capdevielle played there from 1985 to 1994.

Notable people linked to the commune
Henri d'Aramitz lived in the commune. He was the son of Charles Aramitz and a sergeant in the company of musketeers who was the inspiration for Aramis in the novels The Three Musketeers, Twenty Years After and The Vicomte de Bragelonne by Alexandre Dumas.

See also
Communes of the Pyrénées-Atlantiques department

References

External links
Aramits Official web site 
Aramits on Géoportail, National Geographic Institute (IGN) website 
Aramits on the 1750 Cassini Map

Communes of Pyrénées-Atlantiques